Organotin chemistry is the scientific study of the synthesis and properties of organotin compounds or stannanes, which are organometallic compounds containing tin carbon bonds. The first organotin compound was diethyltin diiodide, discovered by Edward Frankland in 1849. The area grew rapidly in the 1900s, especially after the discovery of the Grignard reagents, which are useful for producing Sn–C bonds. The area remains rich with many applications in industry and continuing activity in the research laboratory.

Structure
Organotin compounds are generally classified according to their oxidation states. Tin(IV) compounds are much more common and more useful.

Organic derivatives of tin(IV)
The tetraorgano derivatives are invariably tetrahedral. Compounds of the type SnRR'R''R''' have been resolved into individual enantiomers.

Organotin halides
Organotin chlorides have the formula  for values of n up to 3. Bromides, iodides, and fluorides are also known but less important. These compounds are known for many R groups. They are always tetrahedral. The tri- and dihalides form adducts with good Lewis bases such as pyridine. The fluorides tend to associate such that dimethyltin difluoride forms sheet-like polymers. Di- and especially triorganotin halides, e.g. tributyltin chloride, exhibit toxicities approaching that of hydrogen cyanide.

Organotin hydrides
Organotin hydrides have the formula  for values of n up to 3. The parent member of this series, stannane, is an unstable colourless gas. Stability is correlated with the number of organic substituents. Tributyltin hydride is used as a source of hydride radical in some organic reactions.

Organotin oxides and hydroxides

Organotin oxides and hydroxides are common products from the hydrolysis of organotin halides. Unlike the corresponding derivatives of silicon and germanium, tin oxides and hydroxides often adopt structures with penta- and even hexacoordinated tin centres, especially for the diorgano- and monoorgano derivatives. The group  is called a stannoxane (which is a tin analogue of ethers), and the group  is also called a stannanol (which is a tin analogue of alcohols). Structurally simplest of the oxides and hydroxides are the triorganotin derivatives. A commercially important triorganotin hydroxide is the acaricide cyhexatin (also called Plictran, tricyclohexyltin hydroxide and tricyclohexylstannanol), (. Such triorganotin hydroxides exist in equilibrium with the distannoxanes:

With only two organic substituents on each Sn centre, the diorganotin oxides and hydroxides are structurally more complex than the triorgano derivatives. The simple tin geminal diols (the tin analogues of geminal diols ) and monomeric stannanones (the tin analogues of ketones ) are unknown. The distannoxanes exist as dimers with the formula  wherein the X groups (e.g., chloride –Cl, hydroxide –OH, carboxylate ) can be terminal or bridging (see Table). The hydrolysis of the monoorganotin trihalides has the potential to generate stannanoic acids, . As for the diorganotin oxides/hydroxides, the monoorganotin species form structurally complex because of the occurrence of dehydration/hydration, aggregation. Illustrative is the hydrolysis of butyltin trichloride to give .

Hypercoordinated stannanes
Unlike carbon(IV) analogues but somewhat like silicon compounds, tin(IV) can also be coordinated to five and even six atoms instead of the regular four. These hypercoordinated compounds usually have electronegative substituents. Numerous examples of hypercoordinated compounds are provided by the organotin oxides and associated carboxylates and related pseudohalide derivatives. The organotin halides for adducts, e.g. ).

The all-organic penta- and hexaorganostannates(IV) have even been characterized, while in the subsequent year a six-coordinated tetraorganotin compound was reported. A crystal structure of room-temperature stable (in argon) all-carbon pentaorganostannate(IV) was reported as the lithium salt with this structure:

In this distorted trigonal bipyramidal structure the carbon to tin bond lengths (2.26 Å apical, 2.17 Å equatorial) are larger than regular C-Sn bonds (2.14 Å) reflecting its hypercoordinated nature.

Triorganotin cations
Some reactions of triorganotin halides implicate a role for  intermediates. Such cations are analogous to carbocations. They have been characterized crystallographically when the organic substituents are large, such as 2,4,6-triisopropylphenyl.

Tin radicals (organic derivatives of tin(III))
Tin radicals, with the formula , are called stannyl radicals. They are invoked as intermediates in certain atom-transfer reactions. For example, tributyltin hydride (tris(n-butyl)stannane) serves as a useful source of "hydrogen atoms" because of the stability of the tributytin radical.

Organic derivatives of tin(II)
Organotin(II) compounds are somewhat rare. Compounds with the empirical formula  are somewhat fragile and exist as rings or polymers when R is not bulky. The polymers, called polystannanes, have the formula .

In principle, compounds of tin(II) might be expected to form a tin analogues of alkenes with a formal double bond between two tin atoms or between a tin atom and a carbon group atom (e.g.  and ). Indeed, compounds with the formula , called distannenes or distannylenes, which are tin analogues of ethylenes , are known for certain organic substituents. The Sn centres in stannenes are trigonal. But, contrary to the C centres in alkenes which are trigonal planar, the Sn centres in stannenes tend to be highly pyramidal. Monomeric compounds with the formula , tin analogues of carbenes  are also known in a few cases. Such species reversibly dimerize to the distannylene upon crystallization:

Stannenes, compounds with tin-carbon double bonds, are exemplified by derivatives of stannabenzene. Stannoles, structural analogs of cyclopentadiene, exhibit little C-Sn double bond character.

Organic derivatives of tin(I)
Compounds of Sn(I) are rare and only observed with very bulky ligands. One prominent family of cages is accessed by pyrolysis of the 2,6-diethylphenyl-substituted tristannylene [Sn(C6H3-2,6-Et2)2]3, which affords the cubane-type cluster and a prismane. These cages contain Sn(I) and have the formula [Sn(C6H3-2,6-Et2)]n where n = 8, 10 and Et stands for ethyl group. A stannyne contains a tin atom to carbon group atom triple bond (e.g.  and ), and a distannyne a triple bond between two tin atoms. Distannynes only exist for extremely bulky substituents. Unlike alkynes, the  core of these distannynes are nonlinear, although they are planar. The Sn-Sn distance is 3.066(1) Å, and the Sn-Sn-C angles are 99.25(14)°. Such compounds are prepared by reduction of bulky aryltin(II) halides.

Preparation 
Organotin compounds can be synthesised by numerous methods. Classic is the reaction of a Grignard reagent with tin halides for example tin tetrachloride. An example is provided by the synthesis of tetraethyltin:

The symmetrical tetraorganotin compounds, especially tetraalkyl derivatives, can then be converted to various mixed chlorides by redistribution reactions (also known as the "Kocheshkov comproportionation" in the case of organotin compounds):

A related method involves redistribution of tin halides with organoaluminium compounds.

The mixed organo-halo tin compounds can be converted to the mixed organic derivatives, as illustrated by the synthesis of dibutyldivinyltin:

The organotin hydrides are generated by reduction of the mixed alkyl chlorides. For example, treatment of dibutyltin dichloride with lithium aluminium hydride gives the dibutyltin dihydride, a colourless distillable oil:

The Wurtz-like coupling of alkyl sodium compounds with tin halides yields tetraorganotin compounds.

Hydrostannylation involves the metal-catalyzed addition of tin hydrides across unsaturated substrates.

Reactions 
Important reactions, discussed above, usually focus on organotin halides and pseudohalides with nucleophiles. In the area of organic synthesis, the Stille reaction is considered important. It entails coupling reaction with sp2-hybridized organic halides (e.g. vinyl chloride ) catalyzed by palladium:
  

and organostannane additions (nucleophilic addition of an allyl-, allenyl-, or propargylstannanes to an aldehydes and imines). Organotin compounds are also used extensively in radical chemistry (e.g. radical cyclizations, Barton–McCombie deoxygenation, Barton decarboxylation, etc.).

Applications
An organotin compound is commercially applied as stabilizers in polyvinyl chloride. In this capacity, they suppress degradation by removing allylic chloride groups and by absorbing hydrogen chloride. This application consumes about 20,000 tons of tin each year. The main class of organotin compounds are diorganotin dithiolates with the formula . The Sn-S bond is the reactive component. Diorganotin carboxylates, e.g., dibutyltin dilaurate, are used as catalysts for the formation of polyurethanes, for vulcanization of silicones, and transesterification.

n-Butyltin trichloride is used in the production of tin dioxide layers on glass bottles by chemical vapor deposition.

Biological applications
"Tributyltins" are used as industrial biocides, e.g. as antifungal agents in textiles and paper, wood pulp and paper mill systems, breweries, and industrial cooling systems. Triphenyltin derivatives are used as active components of antifungal paints and agricultural fungicides. Other triorganotins are used as miticides and acaricides. Tributyltin oxide has been extensively used as a wood preservative.

Tributyltin compounds were once widely used as marine anti-biofouling agents to improve the efficiency of ocean-going ships. Concerns over toxicity of these compounds (some reports describe biological effects to marine life at a concentration of 1 nanogram per liter) led to a worldwide ban by the International Maritime Organization. As anti-fouling compounds, organotin compounds have been replaced by dichlorooctylisothiazolinone.

Toxicity 
The toxicities of tributyltin and triphenyltin derivatives compounds are comparable to that of hydrogen cyanide. Furthermore, tri-n-alkyltins are phytotoxic and therefore cannot be used in agriculture. Depending on the organic groups, they can be powerful bactericides and fungicides. Reflecting their high bioactivity, "tributyltins" were once used in marine anti-fouling paint.

In contrast to the triorganotin compounds, monoorgano, diorgano- and tetraorganotin compounds are far less dangerous.

DBT may however be immunotoxic.

See also 
 Organostannane addition
 Tributyltin azide
 Carbastannatranes

References

External links 
 National Pollutant Inventory Fact Sheet for organotins
 Industry information site
 Organotin chemistry in synthesis

 
Obsolete pesticides
Endocrine disruptors